High Ground is a 2020 Australian film directed by Stephen Maxwell Johnson, based on historical events that took place in Arnhem Land in the Northern Territory of Australia, set just after World War I. It has variously been called a revisionist Western and meat pie Western, but the filmmakers prefer to call it a "Northern", as it tells of a true historical event in a fictionalised manner but with very close attention to and respect for Aboriginal culture.

The film premiered at the 70th Berlin International Film Festival on 23 February 2020,  with the Australian premiere at the Brisbane International Film Festival later that year, and theatrical release in Australia on 28 January 2021.

Plot
After fighting in World War I as a sniper, Travis, now a policeman in northern Australia, loses control of an operation that results in the massacre of a group of Yolngu people in Arnhem Land) in 1919. After his superiors insist on burying the truth, Travis leaves in disgust, only to be forced back twelve years later to hunt down Baywara, an Aboriginal warrior whose attacks on new settlers are causing havoc. When Travis recruits mission-raised Gutjuk, the only known massacre survivor, as his tracker, the truth of the past is revealed and Travis becomes the hunted.

Cast
 Jacob Junior Nayinggul as Gutjuk
 Simon Baker as Travis
 Callan Mulvey as Eddy
 Jack Thompson as Moran
 Caren Pistorius as Claire
 Ryan Corr as Braddock
 Aaron Pedersen as Walter
 Sean Mununggurr as Baywara 
 Witiyana Marika as Grandfather Darrpa 
 Esmerelda Marimowa as Gulwirri 
 Maximillian Johnson as Bruce 
 David McMahon as Court

Themes

The film includes the depiction of a fictionalised version of a real historical massacre known as the Gan Gan massacre that occurred in 1911, when over 30 men, women and children were killed by colonial police and settlers.

Although described as a Western, revisionist Western or "meat pie western" in many sources, Johnson prefers the term "Northern", because it is a fictionalised retelling of a true story, and the film respectfully and meticulously documents Aboriginal culture, in close consultation with the Yolngu people, upon whose history it is based. Johnson said "We really feel it's a film that immerses the audience in a time and place and that perhaps hasn't happened in this way before", and producer Witiyana Marika called it a "northern action thriller". Johnson also said "There's a thriller aspect to it. It's not a Western, it's a Northern".

The story is based on a multitude of real-life past events, most of which are still in the living memory of people who were consulted in the making of the film. Johnson and his team strove to make it a balanced film – he uses the Yolngu language word makarrata – in order to convey the story as a missed opportunity, where mistakes were made by both settler and Indigenous people, who were all flawed human beings. He describes it as a "deeply human story".

Production
The film was shot on location in the Kakadu National Park and in Arnhem Land, Northern Territory, Australia. Some was shot near Gunbalanya, which probably inspired the mission.

The film was a High Ground Pictures production. It was financed by Screen Australia, Maxo Studios, Screen Territory, Film Victoria, Bunya Productions and Savage Films.

Director Stephen Johnson's friend Witiyana Marika served as co-producer and senior cultural adviser, and also played the part of Grandfather Dharrpa, while another good friend, Chris Anastassiades, who had also collaborated on Yolngu Boy, wrote the screenplay. Although the story was set in Bininj country in West Arnhem Land, while the 26 clans of Yolngu people live in East Arnhem Land, the film was cast from across Arnhem Land and includes people drawn from the many peoples of the land.

Release
The film premiered at the 70th Berlin International Film Festival on 23 February 2020 with a gala screening, and was selected for the Berlinale Special section. The film was originally slated for release in Australia on 9 July 2020; this was later changed to early 2021, until a further announcement on 1 October 2020 revealed the Brisbane International Film Festival would host the Australian premiere. It was also shown in the Adelaide Film Festival from 17 October, with several extra sessions added to the original schedule.

The film was released theatrically in Australia on 28 January 2021 by Madman Films.

Reception
The site's critical consensus reads, "A gripping action story as well as sobering commentary on colonialism, High Ground is a vividly engrossing attempt to grapple with Australian history."

The Film Critics Circle of Australia named High Ground the Best Australian Film of 2021, and it earned eight AACTA Award nominations.

Accolades

Footnotes

References

Further reading

External links
 
 
 High Ground website at Bunya Productions
 Screen Australia The Screen Guide: High Ground

2020 films
2020 action thriller films
Australian action thriller films
Australian films about revenge
Films about Aboriginal Australians
Films set in the 1910s
Films set in the 1920s
Films set in the 1930s
Films set in the Northern Territory
2020s English-language films